Nadrey Ange Stephane Dago (born 7 May 1997) is an Ivorian professional footballer who plays as a winger for Greek Super League club Panetolikos.

Career
Born in Attécoubé in the Ivory Coast, Dago's first senior club was Sesvete in the Croatian Second Football League. He joined Osijek's reserve team in 2019. For the first half of the 2020–21 season, he played for Dugopolje.

On 3 February 2021, Dago signed for Moldovan National Division club FC Sheriff Tiraspol. On 14 January 2022, Sheriff Tiraspol confirmed that Dago had left the club. On 31 January 2022, Dago signed for Panetolikos.

References

External links

1997 births
Living people
People from Abidjan
Association football wingers
Ivorian footballers
Ivorian expatriate footballers
Expatriate footballers in Croatia
Ivorian expatriate sportspeople in Croatia
Expatriate footballers in Moldova
Ivorian expatriate sportspeople in Moldova
Expatriate footballers in Greece
Ivorian expatriate sportspeople in Greece
NK Sesvete players
NK Dugopolje players
FC Sheriff Tiraspol players
Panetolikos F.C. players
First Football League (Croatia) players
Second Football League (Croatia) players
Moldovan Super Liga players
Super League Greece players